The Sri Lanka national cricket team visited the West Indies in April 1996 and played a single Limited Overs International (LOI) only on 13 April 1996 at Queen's Park Oval, Port of Spain, Trinidad, against the West Indies cricket team. The match was played to celebrate 100 years of cricket at the Queen's Park Oval.

Sri Lanka won by 35 runs and were captained by Arjuna Ranatunga; West Indies by Courtney Walsh.

ODI summary

References

External links

1996 in Sri Lankan cricket
1996 in West Indian cricket
International cricket competitions from 1994–95 to 1997
Sri Lankan cricket tours of the West Indies